Wael Dabbous is a UK-based journalist.

Together with Ramita Navai, Dabbous was awarded an Emmy as director of Frontline: Syria Undercover broadcast on PBS in the US, a programme tackling the ongoing (since March 2011) revolution in Syria. Dabbous has also been associated with a number of other documentary films broadcast on television, including documentaries on child prisoners in Burundi, broadcast on Channel 4 on free-to-air television in the UK

Dabbous attended Moulsham High School in Chelmsford, Essex in England.

References

Living people
Year of birth missing (living people)
Place of birth missing (living people)
British male journalists